Sanquirico is an Italian surname. Notable people with the surname include:

Alessandro Sanquirico (1777–1849), Italian scenic designer, architect and painter
Pio Sanquirico (1847–1900), Italian painter

Italian-language surnames